Huff (stylized as  HUFF!) is an American drama television series that aired on Showtime from November 7, 2004, to June 25, 2006. It won three Primetime Emmy Awards from ten nominations, as well as being nominated for a Golden Globe Award and a Screen Actors Guild Award.

The storyline is centred around psychiatrist Craig Huffstodt. He is a good therapist and middle-aged family man in the middle of a mid-life crisis. His own family's private lives are chaotic, including a mentally incurable uncle Teddy, who fascinates Craig's adolescent son Byrd.

Cast and characters
Besides Azaria, the cast included Paget Brewster, Blythe Danner (who won the Emmy Award in 2005 and 2006 for Outstanding Supporting Actress in a Drama Series for her role as Izzy), Oliver Platt, Anton Yelchin, Andy Comeau, Kimberly Brooks, Liza Lapira, and Faith Prince.

Those making recurring guest appearances on the show during its first season included Lara Flynn Boyle, Robert Forster, Swoosie Kurtz, Annie Potts, and Faith Prince. In its second season, Huff also managed to attract high-profile recurring guest stars, including Sharon Stone and Anjelica Huston.

Main

 Hank Azaria as Dr. Craig "Huff" Huffstodt: a Los Angeles psychiatrist whose life is sent reeling when a tragedy occurs in his office. An eternal caretaker who thinks he can save people, Huff learns very brutally that he can't save everyone. He deals with the functionally insane all day, and when he comes home, he's faced with the daily insanities of family life.
 Paget Brewster as Beth Huffstodt: Huff's loving yet capricious wife. She helps Huff avoid meltdowns, while providing welcome, wifely support and amenities.
 Oliver Platt as Russell Tupper: Huff's lawyer, longtime friend and former running buddy from their single days. Although a source of questionable ethics and morality, he still gets it done with a sense of humor and comes through for Huff.
 Blythe Danner as Isabelle "Izzy" Huffstodt: Huff's mother who has lived in the apartment above the garage since the breakup of her marriage. Izzy is tough and manipulative but also funny and irreverent.
 Anton Yelchin as Byrd Huffstodt: Huff and Beth's 14-year-old son. He is a loving child who is concerned with his father's well-being and to what's going on in the family. He's a very bright teenager.
 Andy Comeau as Theodore "Teddy" Huffstodt: Huff's younger brother. Literally and figuratively locked away in a private mental institution, Teddy's mental illness brings clarity of thought for Huff during his visits.
 Kimberly Brooks as Paula Dellahouse: Huff's office manager who protects him as much as she provokes him. She has been with Huff for a long time and knows him and his family very well.
 Liza Lapira as Maggie Del Rosario: Russell's utterly devoted yet pull-no-punches assistant. She cares for him, covers for him and curses him, but it's all in a day's work for her as she knows she's probably the only woman Russell has ever allowed himself to truly depend on.
 Faith Prince as Kelly Knippers: a television sales rep whom Russell meets and woos while shopping for a flat screen. A wild night of partying and debauchery results in a pregnancy that changes both their lives.

Recurring

Season 1
 Robert Forster as Ben Huffstodt
 Swoosie Kurtz as Madeleine Sullivan
 Jack Laufer as The Homeless Hungarian
 Annie Potts as Doris Johnson
 Misti Traya as Gail
 Lara Flynn Boyle as Melody Coatar
 January Jones as Marisa Wells

Season 2
 Tom Skerritt as Ben Huffstodt
 Jack Laufer as The Homeless Hungarian
 Ashley Williams as Alyssa
 Anjelica Huston as Dr. Lena Markova
 Sharon Stone as Dauri Rathburn
 Alex Black as Tim Winnick
 Missy Crider as Natalie

Production and broadcast

The series was created by Bob Lowry and features Hank Azaria as Dr. Craig "Huff" Huffstodt, a psychiatrist whose life changes abruptly when a 15-year-old client commits suicide in his office. The series follows Huff, his family, and his friend Russell Tupper, played by Oliver Platt, as they navigate life.

The first season was broadcast on Showtime between November 7, 2004, and January 30, 2005. The second season premiered on April 2, 2006, and ended on June 25, 2006. Two days before the finale, Showtime announced that the show would not be picked up for a third season, and several plotlines, including the resolution of pending criminal charges against Russell Tupper and the possibility of reconciliation between Huff and Beth were left unresolved.

The two-hour pilot episode was filmed in Vancouver, British Columbia. Later, production for Huff was moved to Delfino Stages in Los Angeles, California.

Episodes

Season 1 (2004–2005)

Season 2 (2006)

Home media
Huff - Season One was released on Region 1 DVD on March 21, 2006. All 13 episodes from the first season are presented in Anamorphic widescreen (1.78:1) with Dolby Digital 5.1 Audio. Extras include commentary tracks on four episodes, three featurettes, five minutes of deleted scenes and a gag reel.

Huff - The Complete 2nd Season was made available in 2012 as a three-disc DVD set, but is only produced via a "manufacture on demand" format through Sony Pictures Home Entertainment.

Awards and nominations

References

External links
 

2000s American comedy-drama television series
2004 American television series debuts
2006 American television series endings
Showtime (TV network) original programming
English-language television shows
Television series by Sony Pictures Television
Television shows set in Los Angeles
Bipolar disorder in fiction
Primetime Emmy Award-winning television series